The Pizza Show is a television series about pizza broadcast by Viceland starring Frank Pinello.

See also

 List of programs broadcast by Viceland

References

External links
 
 
 

2016 American television series debuts
2018 American television series endings
English-language television shows
Food and drink television series
Pizza
Viceland original programming